Fissicera is a monotypic snout moth genus in the family Pyralidae. Its only species, Fissicera spicata, is found on Dominica. Both the genus and species were first described by Jay C. Shaffer in 1978.

References

Phycitinae
Monotypic moth genera
Moths of the Caribbean